Molard Noir is a mountain of Savoie, France. It lies in the Jura range. It has an elevation of 1,452 metres above sea level.

Mountains of Savoie